Claverton may refer to the following places in England:

 Claverton, Somerset
 Claverton, Cheshire